Clarence is an electoral district of the Legislative Assembly in the Australian state of New South Wales.

It includes all of the Clarence Valley Council including Grafton, Maclean, Yamba, Illuka, Junction Hill, Ulmarra, Coutts Crossing and Glenreagh, as well as all of the Richmond Valley Council including Casino, Coraki, Woodburn, Evans Head and Tatham.

History
Clarence was created in 1859, replacing the New South Wales part of Clarence and Darling Downs. With the introduction of proportional representation in 1920, it was absorbed into Byron along with Lismore.  It was recreated in 1927.

It has historically been a safe  seat, having been held by that party for all but seven years in its current incarnation. However,  has won it at high-tide elections.

Members for Clarence

Election results

References

Clarence